Mikulić may refer to:

Božo Mikulić (born 1997), Croatian footballer
Branko Mikulić (1928–1994), communist politician and statesman in the Yugoslavia
Ivan Mikulić (born 1968), Herzegovinian Croat singer who represented Croatia in the Eurovision Song Contest 2004
Josip Mikulić (born 1986), Bosnian football defender, currently playing for NK Zagreb
Tomislav Mikulić (born 1982), Croatian football player who plays as a defender
Zoran Mikulić (born 1965), Croatian handball player
Zvonimir Mikulić (born 1990), Croatian footballer

Croatian surnames